Harshit Rana (born 22 December 2001) is an Indian cricketer. In February 2022, he was bought by the Kolkata Knight Riders in the auction for the 2022 Indian Premier League (IPL) tournament. He made his Twenty20 debut on 28 April 2022, for the Kolkata Knight Riders in the 2022 IPL.

References

External links
 

2001 births
Living people
Indian cricketers
People from New Delhi
Kolkata Knight Riders cricketers